Arang Legislative Assembly constituency is one of the 90 Legislative Assembly constituencies of Chhattisgarh state in India.  The seat has formed after the demolition of Raipur Town Vidhansabha Constituency in 2008.

It is part of Raipur district and is reserved for candidates belonging to the Scheduled Castes.

Members of the Legislative Assembly

Election results

2018

See also
 List of constituencies of the Chhattisgarh Legislative Assembly
 Raipur district

References

Raipur district
Assembly constituencies of Chhattisgarh